is a fictional character in the Soulcalibur series of video games. Created by Namco's Project Soul division, he first appeared in Soul Edge, later appearing in both console and arcade versions of Soulcalibur III, as well as on various merchandise related to the series. He is voiced in Japanese by Jin Yamanoi in Soul Edge and Masaya Takatsuka in Soulcalibur III.

Li Long is an assassin, who failed in a mission to kill the leader of a Japanese pirate faction. Taken in by an innkeeper and his daughter, he fell in love with the girl only for her to be apparently killed. Desiring revenge, he battles wandering swordsmen and steals their weapons, while searching for the cursed sword Soul Edge. After being severely beaten by its wielder and now on the run pursued by assassins sent by his former employer, he reflects on who he is with doubt, until he meets a woman reminding him of his lost love. Reinvigorated, Li Long now searches to discover who he is. As a character, Li Long was positively received, and described as "the most dramatic" of the characters in Soul Edge. His replacement by another character later in the series, Maxi, has been criticized by the media, with several sources stating a preference for him.

Conception and creation

As a character introduced in Soul Edge, Li Long's weapon, a pair of nunchaku with mounted blades, were selected before other elements of the character. One of several weapons initially considered for the character Hwang early in development, they were designed to be unique amongst the other weapons in the game. Li Long's design and concept were built to revolve around them, starting with gender, then physical measurements, and lastly background details. After his appearance and movement were fleshed out by a concept artist, his character was rendered as a 3D model by a design team that worked solely on him, and then animated by a motion designer using motion capture to create his in-game movements. During development, many ideas were considered for Li Long's appearance, including several younger drafts and some with heavy Chinese lettering tattoos across the upper body, before settling upon a "polite young man". It was also considered to allow him to use kung fu attacks as well, but the concept was discarded.

Due to a ban of nunchaku weapons in the United Kingdom, his weapon was changed to a three-section staff for European releases of Soul Blade, with a section of staff replacing the chain in terms of appearance. Li Long was initially considered for inclusion for Soulcalibur with several considered changes, however later in development they decided to instead focus on creating a new character using the same weapon for the title, resulting in Maxi.

Design
In Soul Edge, Li Long appears as a tall, Asian male with his brown hair tied in a knot atop his head with long, thick sideburns. His facial contours, expressions and hairdo were designed to be sharp, intended to suggest the "assassin" side of his character, as well as imply the image of Chinese culture in the character. A large light brown jacket with green trimming covers his arms, while a large belt wraps around his midsection. Dark brown pants ending in white trimming cover his legs, and blue and white stripped shoes cover his feet. His alternate character model varies significantly, featuring a shaved head, blue and gray vest with an open collar, small gold belt, green pants, and blue and red striped shoes.

When considering his appearance for Soulcalibur, several redesigns were considered to make the character more 'attractive', including one with dreadlocks, a heavily bandaged head and scarred body intended to imply his fate at the end of Soul Edge, and another design modeled after his appearance in Soul Edges opening sequence featuring a wide-brimmed hat. These designs were rejected in the end as the developers felt they made the character appear too thin. Elements from the latter two were later reused for his appearance Soulcalibur III, retaining the hat while giving his left eye a damaged look. His outfit resembled the original with the addition of a green vest, bracers, and the lengthening of the tail of his coat to mid-thigh. Meanwhile his alternate character model was more directly based on his alternate in Soul Edge, with minimal changes save for opening the vest to have his chest be bare.

In video games
Introduced in Soul Edge, Li Long is an assassin sent by the Emperor of China to kill a pirate lord, but failed. Badly injured, he was rescued by a fugitive female ninja named Chie and eventually fell in love with her. One day, her former comrades pursuing Chie caught up with them and she was believed to be dead. Told falsely the swordsman Heishirō Mitsurugi was responsible, he set out after Soul Edge knowing Mitsurugi was also after the blade. Along the way he takes the weapons of other fighters he defeats, repurposing some for his own use. Upon finding and defeating him, he realized Mitsurugi had no part in the attack upon Chie, and continued his goal of searching for Soul Edge. He located its wielder, Cervantes, but was beaten severely. Revealed to have survived in Soulcalibur III but having lost an eye, he found himself on the run from assassins sent by his Chie's former clan leader. Traveling by night under a false name, he was taken in by a girl that reminded him of Chie. When the assassins eventually found him, Li Long stood his ground and defeated them. Remembering the feel of fighting for something other than revenge, he set out to find himself, not knowing that Chie was actually alive and, after giving birth to their son, had set out to find him. By Soulcalibur V it is revealed he has reunited with his family, and they now live with the ninja Taki's clan after learning of Chie's survival from her.

Gameplay
Li Long's fighting style in Soul Edge has been described as accessible to novices of the game, while also usable by experienced players. His Reverse Scales attack consists of three swift horizontal attacks one after another, while his Flaming Fangs attack is similar, only vertical, requiring opponents to guard the attacks differently. Other attacks also consist of variations of existing moves with a different conclusion, such as his Combined Wind and Sand-Dust attacks, which both give similar visible cues but with the latter ending in a lower strike. Others moves such as Violent Cannon make use of feints, appearing to attack from one angle but striking from another.

In Soulcalibur III, Li Long represents the game's "nunchaku" fighting style available to player-created characters through the game's character creation mode. Though the style utilized several elements from Maxi, many elements were altered, including attack commands, stance, and a separate series of weapons. With the character's inclusion in the arcade edition of Soulcalibur III, alterations were made to further define Li Long's fighting style as unique, modifying several attacks to utilize two nunchaku simultaneously as a result.

Promotion and reception 
In addition to artwork, many promotional items for Soul Edge featured Li Long's likeness, including toys, window shades and table coasters. A two-page promotional comic was also released by Namco for the character, featuring Mitsurugi attempting to assist him in winning Chie's heart. In it, he stages a kidnapping so Long can 'rescue' Chie, however a stiff breeze blows away Long's hairpiece revealing him to be completely bald, shocking both Mitsurugi and Chie.

In a 2002 poll by Namco prior to the release of Soulcalibur II regarding their favorite character from the series, Li Long placed last, part of a three-way tie with 1% of the poll's results. However, according to promotional material for Soulcalibur IIIs arcade version, Long was included due to being popular with fans of the series. Later in an interview, Soulcalibur IV director Katsutoshi Sasaki stated many fans had requested for the character to reappear in the franchise, though added no plans had been made to release the character as downloadable content for the title.

MAXIMUM described him as "one of the most dramatic characters in the game", citing visible similarity to actor Bruce Lee's use of nunchaku. Retronauts in their retrospective of the series cited Li Long as an aspect of Soul Edge not included in later titles they missed. Comparisons have been drawn between the character and later series character Maxi, with sources such as 1UP.com stating preference for the former. GameDaily staff writer Eugene Huang shared the sentiment while naming him as one of his favorite characters, describing his attacks as "focused around efficacy and efficiency" and praising the character as having a compelling backstory. In 2016, University of Delaware professor Rachel Hutchinson cited Li Long as an example of 'virtual colonialism', noting the designers' emphasis on particular traits during his development and lack of aging between his initial appearance and Soulcalibur III to symbolize China as the exotic 'other' in the eyes of Japanese players.

References 

Fantasy video game characters
Fictional Ming dynasty people
Fictional assassins in video games
Fictional characters from Beijing
Fictional Chinese people in video games
Fictional criminals in video games
Fictional nunchakuka
Fictional Lóng Xíng Mó Qiáo practitioners
Fictional professional thieves
Male characters in video games
Soulcalibur series characters
Video game characters introduced in 1995